Rhytiphora dallasi is a species of beetle in the family Cerambycidae. It was described by Francis Polkinghorne Pascoe in 1869. It is known from Australia.

References

dallasi
Beetles described in 1869